Pietro Ferraris (15 February 1912 – 11 October 1991) was an Italian footballer who played as a forward. Throughout his career, he won 6 Serie A titles with Ambrosiana-Inter and Torino, and the 1938 FIFA World Cup with the Italy national football team, where he scored Italy's fastest ever World Cup goal.

Club career
Ferraris was born in Vercelli, Piedmont. He was also known as "Ferraris II", to distinguish him from Mario Ferraris I.

He made his club debut with Pro Vercelli (1929–32) on 10 November 1929, in a 3–1 away loss to Triestina, and scored his first Serie A goal on 13 April 1930, in a 6–0 home win over Triestina, once again. He spent most of his career playing for Ambrosiana-Inter (1936–41), alongside Giuseppe Meazza, and later Torino (1941–48), becoming a member of Ferruccio Novo's Grande Torino side; he also played for Napoli (1932–36), and Novara (1948–50), before retiring. In total, he scored 123 goals in 469 appearances in Serie A. In total, he won 6 Serie A titles: 2 with Inter, in 1937–38 and 1939–40, and 4 with Torino, in 1942–43, 1945–46, 1946–47, and 1947–48; he also won two Coppa Italia titles: 1 with Inter, in 1938–39, and 1 with Torino, in 1942–43.

International career
At international level, Ferraris made 14 appearances for Italy between 1935 and 1947, scoring 3 goals. He made his international debut on 17 February 1935, in a 2–1 home win over France, and he later represented Italy at the 1938 FIFA World Cup, as the Italians went on to win the tournament. He scored his first goal for Italy, and his only goal of the tournament, in the second minute of their first round match of the World Cup against Norway, on 5 June, which ended in a 2–1 win; along with Bruno Mora's goal against Switzerland in the 1962 FIFA World Cup, this is Italy's fastest ever World Cup goal.

Style of play
Capable of playing both as a striker or as a winger, Ferraris was a quick, efficient, intuitive, and intelligent player, with excellent technical skills, creativity, and an eye for goal. He was an accurate striker of the ball from close or mid range, and was also known for his positional sense, distribution, work-rate, professionalism, and longevity throughout his career.

Career statistics

International goals

Honours

Club
Ambrosiana-Inter
Serie A: 1937–38, 1939–40
Coppa Italia: 1938–39

Torino
Serie A: 1942–43, 1945–46, 1946–47, 1947–48 
Coppa Italia: 1942–43

International
Italy
FIFA World Cup: 1938

References

External links

1912 births
1991 deaths
People from Vercelli
Italian footballers
Italy international footballers
Inter Milan players
S.S.C. Napoli players
Torino F.C. players
F.C. Pro Vercelli 1892 players
Serie A players
1938 FIFA World Cup players
FIFA World Cup-winning players
Novara F.C. players
Association football forwards
Footballers from Piedmont
Sportspeople from the Province of Vercelli